Magnus I may refer to:

 Magnus I of Norway (1024–1047), King of Norway and King of Denmark
 Magnus Barefoot (1073– 1103), King of Norway (as Magnus III)
 Magnus I of Orkney (ruled from 1108 to about 1115)
 Magnus I of Sweden, King of Sweden (ca. 1106–1134)
 Magnus III of Sweden, as Duke of Sweden; sometimes referred to as King Magnus I, because the Magnus I above is sometimes regarded as an usurper (1240–1290)
 Magnus, Duke of Saxony (c. 1045–1106), duke of Saxony
 Magnus I, Duke of Lauenburg (1470–1543), Duke of Saxe-Lauenburg from the Ascanian House
 Magnus I, Duke of Mecklenburg
 Magnus, Duke of Östergötland (1542–1595), prince of Sweden, Duke of Östergötland

he:מגנוס הראשון, מלך נורבגיה